Úlfarsfell or Grafarholt og Úlfarsárdalur , is a district of Reykjavík, the capital of Iceland, and forms part of the eastern suburbs.

External links

References

Districts of Reykjavík